An antimony pill is a pill made from metallic antimony. It was a popular remedy in the nineteenth century, and it was used to purge and revitalise the bowels. In use, it is swallowed and allowed to pass through the body, after which it is customarily recovered for reuse, giving rise to the name everlasting pill. The antimonial cup yielded the same effect.

According to the Medico-Pharmaceutical Critic and Guide (1907), edited by William J. Robinson:

See also 

Antimonial
Antimonial cup

References

External links

Abandoned drugs
Antimony